Yılmaz Atadeniz (born 1 February 1932) is a Turkish film director, producer and screenwriter. He directed 80 films between 1963 and 1997.

Selected filmography
 Killing in Istanbul (1967)
 The Deathless Devil (1972)
 A Season in Hakkari (1983)

References

External links

1932 births
Living people
Turkish film directors
Turkish film producers
Turkish male screenwriters
Film people from Istanbul
Golden Orange Life Achievement Award winners